Freak Out! is the fifth album by Teenage Bottlerocket. It was released on July 3, 2012 on Fat Wreck Chords. The band began work on the album in February 2012 at The Blasting Room with engineer Andrew Berlin, who also co-produced the album with the band, and finished in April.

Two of the songs, "Mutilate Me" and "Punk House of Horror", were previously released on the 2011 "'Mutilate Me" EP. Another song, "Headbanger", was previously recorded by Sack, a band which featured TBR members Kody Templeman, Ray Carlisle and Brandon Carlisle. The band shot a music video for "Headbanger".

Track listing

Credits
Teenage Bottlerocket
Ray Carlisle - Vocals/Guitar
Kody Templeman - Vocals/Guitar
Miguel Chen - Bass guitar
Brandon Carlisle - Drums

Artwork

Dawn Wilson - Photography

Production
Andrew Berlin	 - Producer, engineer, Mastering, mixing

References

2012 albums
Fat Wreck Chords albums
Teenage Bottlerocket albums